Cruden is a surname. Notable people with the surname include:

Aaron Cruden (born 1989), New Zealand rugby player
Alexander Cruden (1699–1770), Scottish author
Damian Cruden, British theatre director
James Cruden, birth name of Jack Milroy (1915–2001), Scottish comedian
Siegfried Cruden, (born 1959), Surinamese track and field athlete
William Cruden (1726–1785), Scottish minister and author

See also
Cruden BV, motion simulators
Cruden Bay, village in Scotland
Cruden (parish), parish in Aberdeenshire, Scotland
Cruden's Concordance, book written by Alexander Cruden